AIT or Ait may refer to:

Geography
 Ait, a small island found in the middle of a river or lake
 Friesoythe, a town in Germany, known in Saterland Frisian name as Ait or Äit
 Ait, Uttar Pradesh, a town in India

Government
 American Institute in Taiwan, representative office of the U.S. in Taiwan
 Asylum and Immigration Tribunal, a former British UK tribunal

Education

India
 Acharya Institute of Technology, in Bangalore
 Adichunchanagiri Institute of Technology, in Karnataka
 Adithya Institute of Technology, in Coimbatore
 Army Institute of Technology, in Pune

United States
 Advanced Individual Training, the second stage of United States Army Basic Training
 Aeromedical Isolation Team, of the US Army Medical Research Institute of Infectious Diseases
 Academy for Information Technology, a high school in Scotch Plains, New Jersey

Elsewhere
 Accra Institute of Technology, in Ghana
 Aichi Institute of Technology, in Toyota, Japan
 Aligarh Institute of Technology, in Karachi, Pakistan
 Aquincum Institute of Technology, a study abroad opportunity for North American undergraduates in Budapest, Hungary
 Asian Institute of Technology, in Bangkok, Thailand 
 Athlone Institute of Technology, in Ireland
 Auckland University of Technology, formerly Auckland Institute of Technology, in New Zealand

Companies
 Africa Independent Television, a Nigerian broadcaster
 Ameritech, a former Regional Bell Operating Company that had NYSE ticker symbol AIT
 Applied Industrial Technologies, American distributor of bearings, adhesives and sealants

Organizations
 Agency for Instructional Technology, American non-profit distributor of educational TV programs
 Alliance Internationale de Tourisme, an international federation of motoring organisations
 Arts Initiative Tokyo, a non-profit collective of curators and art administrators
 Austrian Institute of Technology, a federal research facility in Austria

Other uses
 Advanced Imaging Technology, airport security screening technology
 Advanced Intelligent Tape, a former magnetic tape data storage format
 Agreement on Internal Trade, a trade agreement between Canadian governments
 Algorithmic information theory, a subfield of information theory and computer science
 Amiodarone induced thyrotoxicosis, a drug induced medical condition